The Bermuda women's national field hockey team represents Bermuda in women's international field hockey and is controlled by the Bermuda Hockey Federation, the governing body for field hockey in Bermuda.

Tournament record

Pan American Games
1987 – 7th place

Pan American Cup
2009 – 8th place

Central American and Caribbean Games
1986 – 7th place
1990 – 5th place
1994 – 6th place
1998 – 5th place
2002 – 6th place
2006 – 7th place
2010 – 8th place
2014 – 8th place
 2023 – Qualified

Pan American Challenge
2011 – 5th place

References

External links
Bermuda Hockey Federation

National team
Americas women's national field hockey teams
Field hockey